
Gmina Mińsk Mazowiecki is a rural gmina (administrative district) in Mińsk County, Masovian Voivodeship, in east-central Poland. Its seat is the town of Mińsk Mazowiecki, although the town is not part of the territory of the gmina.

There is nature reserve called Marsh of Pogorzel, with drosera rotundifolia flowers.

Villages
Gmina Mińsk Mazowiecki contains the villages and settlements of Anielew, Arynów, Barcząca, Borek Miński, Brzóze, Budy Barcząckie, Budy Janowskie, Chmielew, Chochół, Cielechowizna, Dłużka, Dziękowizna, Gamratka, Gliniak, Grabina, Grębiszew, Huta Mińska, Ignaców, Iłówiec, Janów, Józefów, Karolina, Karolina-Kolonia, Kluki, Kolonia Janów, Królewiec, Maliszew, Marianka, Mikanów, Niedziałka Druga, Nowe Osiny, Osiny, Podrudzie, Prusy, Stara Niedziałka, Stare Zakole, Stojadła, Targówka, Tartak, Wólka Iłówiecka, Wólka Mińska, Zakole-Wiktorowo, Zamienie and Żuków.

Neighbouring gminas
Gmina Mińsk Mazowiecki is bordered by the town of Mińsk Mazowiecki and by the gminas of Cegłów, Dębe Wielkie, Jakubów, Kołbiel, Siennica, Stanisławów and Wiązowna.

References

Polish official population figures 2006

Minsk Mazowiecki
Mińsk County